Leo Thomas Crowley (August 15, 1889 – April 15, 1972)  was a senior administrator for  President Franklin D. Roosevelt as the head of the Foreign Economic Administration. Previously he had served as Alien Property Custodian and as chief of the Federal Deposit Insurance Corporation. Late in the 1930s, senior Washington officials discovered that Crowley had embezzled from his banks in Wisconsin in the 1920s and early 1930s. This information was suppressed twice because of Crowley's political and administrative usefulness. Biographer Stuart Weiss wrote that Crowley's story is: 
the darker story of the businessman as speculator and embezzler, whose fraud was covered up in Wisconsin and Washington....[in part it is] the morally complex and compelling story of Crowley as a bureaucrat and politician in Washington, administering multiple major agencies, often simultaneously;...but also deeply involved in conflicts of interest a later generation would find unacceptable and even incomprehensible.

Early life
Leo Crowley was born to Thomas and Katie Crowley in Milton, Wisconsin, immigrants of Irish Catholic origin. He went to the University of Wisconsin. His father worked for the Milwaukee Road. Young Leo delivered groceries and saved his tips from customers. In 1905, with $1000 he bought a part of the General Paper Company, some of the products of which he had been bringing to customers. He worked hard to grow the company, and his share in it, until he owned it outright in 1919. That year he took over the T. S. Morris company with financing from Milo Hagen and W.D. Curtis. Selling stock in this company relieved its debt, and he bought a wholesale grocery for his brothers to run, and land in Madison, Wisconsin.

Political life

Crowley began his entry into the political arena by supporting Albert G. Schmedeman for governor of Wisconsin. The biographer Weiss says "He managed Schmedeman as a parent might his children, and as he managed his family and most of the nurses at Saint Mary's Hospital."

Crowley served as a delegate for Al Smith at the Democratic National Convention. He thus came in contact with Jouett Shouse and John J. Raskob, operatives for Al Smith. Progressivism was strong in Wisconsin, as expressed by Senator John J. Blaine and the newspaper Capital Times edited by William T. Evjue. Crowley was effective in bringing about a progressive-democratic alliance for the election of  Franklin Roosevelt.

It was the Glass–Steagall Act that created the Federal Deposit Insurance Corporation (FDIC), one of the most popular elements of the New Deal. The biographer Weiss tells of the incredible tale of how the nearly-bankrupt Crowley became the figurehead for banking security in a time of common bank runs.

Crowley's special capacity for smoothing troubled waters drew him closer to FDR. A wartime cabinet-level conflict involving foreign economic operations in Europe and North Africa threatened cabinet solidarity. So Crowley became head of the Foreign Economic Administration in September 1943, with responsibility for Lend-Lease and Edward R. Stettinius, Jr., was promoted to Undersecretary of State. Crowley was now a cabinet member in the Roosevelt administration.

The skeleton in Crowley's closet was his misappropriation of funds in 1931, early in the Great Depression. Though disguised, his banking misdeeds threatened to undo his place in political diplomacy, for instance years later when Henry Morgenthau, Jr. or Arthur Vandenberg were checking his credentials. His unusually close relations with the President and James F. Byrnes, as well as adroit personal moves, preserved him in office. He had received  the Order of Saint Gregory the Great from Pope Pius XI in 1929. Crowley was an early target of I. F. Stone, whose investigations were republished by the Capital Times in Madison.

Later life
Back in the business world, Crowley was named chairman of the Milwaukee Road in December 1945 and made it turn a profit until the mid-1960s. He continued contact with the White House: President Dwight Eisenhower appointed Crowley to the United States Commission on Civil Rights in his second term, and he was known to have dined with Lyndon Johnson.

Leo Crowley died on April 15, 1972 in a hospital in Madison, Wisconsin.

Very negatively for Crowley in 1955, Harry Truman wrote about how Crowley had caused a problem with the Russians when Germany was defeated. The episode was recounted by daughter Margaret Truman in 1973. She adds:
...the real lesson was one that he hesitated to state in his memoirs – the extreme hostility which certain men in government, such as Mr. Crowley, felt toward Russia. It did not make my father's task any easier, to find the middle path between these men and the Henry Wallace types, who could not believe the Russians were capable of any wrongdoing.

References

Further reading
 Laurence C. Eklund (1969) Advisor to Presidents, The Milwaukee Journal, August 17–27 (ten articles).
 "Leo the Lion", Time Magazine (23 March 1942) (Personal sketch of Crowley).
 "Leo Crowley's Aniline" Time Magazine (26 April 1943) (Crowley and synthetic mica).
 Jeffreys, John W.  (1998) ""One of FDR's Forgotten Men" Humanities and Social Sciences Net-Online.

External links 
 Truman Presidential Library: Photograph in Truman Cabinet, (7th from Left).

Collection of letters and works by Leo Crowley from FRASER
 

1889 births
1972 deaths
People from Milton, Wisconsin
University of Wisconsin–Madison alumni
Wisconsin Democrats
Businesspeople from Wisconsin
American bankers
Chairs of the Federal Deposit Insurance Corporation
Knights of St. Gregory the Great
Franklin D. Roosevelt administration cabinet members
20th-century American politicians
Franklin D. Roosevelt administration personnel
Truman administration personnel